Breakthrough is a 1986 Soviet disaster film directed by Dmitri Svetozarov.

Plot
The film shows a major accident that occurred during the construction of a tunnel leading to the fictional station Petrovskaya of Leningrad Metro. It is based on a similar accident in 1974, in the tunnel between stations Lesnaya and Ploschad Muzhestva, playing up its unique design and geological conditions.

Cast
Oleg Borisov — Head of Lenmetrostroi Boris Savelyevich Poluektov
Andrei Rostotsky — Martynov, head of the mine
Yuri Demich — Deputy. Chief of Lenmetrostroi Yurasov
Mikhail Danilov — Marchuk
Alexander Susnin — foreman Osmyorkin
Yury Kuznetsov — sinker Vyazigin
Andrey Krasko — Drifters Alexander and Bronislav Kostromins
Vladimir Baranov — sinker Sherstobitov
Valery Kravchenko — Morozov, the engineer of the mine electric locomotive
Natalia Akimova — wife of Martynov (daughter of Poluektov)
Yuri Soloviev — engineer Kostyrya
Ivan Agafonov — Comrade Serov, from the regional party committee

References

External links

Soviet drama films
Russian disaster films
1980s disaster films
Lenfilm films
1980s Russian-language films